Oho may refer to:

 Oho!, Finnish entertainment magazine
 Ōhō (応保), Japanese era from 1161 to 1163
 Ōho (大保), Japanese location
 Oho, Japan, a village in Tsukuba District, Ibaraki
 Ōhō Konosuke, Japanese sumo wrestler
 Octahemioctahedron
 Okhotsk Airport (IATA code: OHO), airport in Russia
 Oho, an experiment at KEKB (accelerator)
 Hurricane Oho

See also
 Ooho (disambiguation)